The 2020 LCS season was the third year under partnership and eighth overall of the League of Legends Championship Series (LCS), a professional esports league for the MOBA PC game League of Legends. It was the first year that the league used a double elimination bracket for its playoff format. Championship points and the regional finals were also removed from the World Championship qualification process.

The spring split began on January 25 and was scheduled to conclude with the spring finals on April 19; however, due to the spread of COVID-19 in the United States, the season was temporarily suspended on March 13. Four days later, it was announced that the LCS would resume on March 20, with all matches being played online.

The summer split began on June 12 and concluded with the summer finals on September 6.

The three teams that qualified for the World Championship in 2020 were Team SoloMid, FlyQuest, and Team Liquid.

League changes 
Riot Games announced several changes to the LCS on January 8.

Playoff format 
The LCS changed its playoff format to a double elimination bracket, similar to that which was adopted by the LEC in 2019. The number of teams participating in the spring playoffs was unchanged, remaining at six, but the number of teams in the summer playoffs was increased from six to eight. Both splits' playoffs feature a winners' bracket and a losers' bracket, with the bottom two teams beginning in the losers' and the rest beginning in the winners'.

Schedule 
The LCS regular season schedule was revised for 2020. Four LCS games were broadcast each Saturday and Sunday instead of five, and the remaining two games were aired during "Monday Night League", which would feature the two most anticipated match ups of the week. LCS commissioner Chris Greeley explained that this change was made to give less popular teams and players more exposure and opportunities to develop their brand, as many viewers, he argued, only tune in to watch their favorite teams.

Following community feedback and "careful consideration", LCS officials announced that Monday Night League would be changed to Friday Night League for the summer split.

International qualifications 
The previous system of Championship points and the regional finals were completely removed from the World Championship qualification process. As of 2020, the results of the spring split would only determine the LCS' representative for the Mid-Season Invitational, and did not have any part in determining a team's future qualification for the World Championship. The summer champions, runners-up and third place team would qualify for the World Championship as the LCS' first, second and third seeds, respectively.

Broadcasting 
The English broadcast was available on the LoL Esports website, as well as on Twitch and YouTube. On January 20, Riot Games announced their official partnership with Chinese streaming service Huya, giving them exclusive rights to the Chinese broadcast. On April 8, it was announced that the spring playoffs would be aired on ESPN2 and the ESPN App.

Spring

Teams and rosters

Regular season

Playoffs

Awards

Ranking

Summer

Teams and rosters

Regular season

Playoffs

Winners' bracket

Losers' bracket

Finals

Awards

Ranking

References

External links 
 2020 Official Rules (v. 20.1) LCS and LACS

League of Legends
2020 multiplayer online battle arena tournaments
League of Legends Championship Series seasons
League of Legends Championship Series season, 2020